The Alberta Non-Partisan League was a minor provincial political party in Alberta, Canada. The League changed its name to the Non-Partisan Political League of Canada: Alberta Branch in 1917 as it prepared to move into federal politics. The party changed its name yet again to the Farmers Non-Partisan Political League.

The League was formed to promote the active interest of farmers in the political arena, because it was felt that the Liberal and Conservative parties, federal and provincial, were not serving the interests of farmers. The Non-Partisan League conducted extensive meetings with interested farmers across rural Alberta and was socialist in inclination under the influence of William Irvine.

In the 1917 provincial election, four League members stood as candidates: Louise McKinney in Claresholm, James Weir in Nanton, J.E. Hillier in Pincher Creek and John W. Leedy in Gleichen. As well, there were several affiliated independent and labour candidates (through the NPL co-sponsored Labor Representation League), such as Lorne Proudfoot. McKinney and Weir were elected and sat in the legislature, while Hillier finished third in a tight three-way race and Leedy placed third.

In the months that followed, the party became active in federal politics. The decision was made at a 1917 convention in Calgary. The Non-Partisan Political League of Canada was founded. It nominated three candidates in the December 1917 federal election, all running in Alberta ridings. None were elected.

The league continued organizational efforts for the next few years, gathering a sizeable campaign fund, holding townhalls and increasing its membership. The league's political activities and its two successes pushed the United Farmers of Alberta to either enter electoral politics or face being eclipsed by the NPL. The UFA decided to launch a political arm and, in 1919, absorbed the NPL. The ground work and organization done by the league helped the UFA win a 1919 provincial by-election, a 1921 federal by-election, the 1921 provincial election, when it was elected government of the province, taking a majority of seats in the Legislative Assembly, and an almost-clean sweep of Alberta seats in the 1921 Canadian federal election.

See also
List of Alberta political parties

References

External links
Lorne Proudfoots correspondence with the non-partisan league
news paper clippings and party material relating to the Non-Partisan League
    Louise McKinney non-partisan MLA fonds

Provincial political parties in Alberta
Political parties established in 1916
Political parties disestablished in 1919
Defunct political parties in Canada
1916 establishments in Alberta